The Coppin State Eagles men's basketball team represents Coppin State University in Baltimore, Maryland, United States. The school's team currently competes in the NCAA Division I in the Mid-Eastern Athletic Conference. Before joining NCAA Division I, the Eagles were the 1976 NAIA National Champions.

Postseason results

NCAA tournament results
The Eagles have appeared in the NCAA tournament four times. Their combined record is 1–4. The 1996–97 team was only the third 15 seed to beat a 2 seed in the tournament. The 2007–08 Coppin State team was the first program with 20 losses to play in the NCAA tournament.

NAIA tournament results
The Eagles have appeared in the NAIA Tournament one time. Their record is 5–0, winning the National Championship in 1976.

NIT results
The Eagles have appeared in the National Invitation Tournament (NIT) two times. Their combined record is 1–2.

Notable former players
Joe Brown (NBA G League)
Fred Warrick (NBA G League)
Larry Stewart (NBA Washington Wizards 1991) (1991–1997)
 Joe Pace (NBA Washington Bullets) (1976–1978)

References

External links